Saltfleetby railway station was a station in Saltfleetby, Lincolnshire on the line between Louth and Mablethorpe which was closed in 1960.

This line was connected to the Sutton and Willoughby Railway in 1888 to form the Mablethorpe loop.

The station closed on 5 December 1960 when the line between Louth and Mablethorpe was closed.

References

Bibliography

Disused railway stations in Lincolnshire
Former Great Northern Railway stations
Railway stations in Great Britain opened in 1877
Railway stations in Great Britain closed in 1960